The Montjuïc Communications Tower, popularly known as Torre Calatrava and Torre Telefónica, is a telecommunication tower in the Montjuïc neighbourhood of Barcelona, Catalonia, Spain. It was designed by Santiago Calatrava, with construction taking place from 1989 to 1992. The white tower was built for Telefónica to transmit television coverage of the 1992 Summer Olympic Games in Barcelona. The  tower is located in the Olympic park and represents an athlete holding the Olympic Flame.

The base is covered with trencadís, Gaudí's mosaic technique created from broken tile shards.

Sundial 
Because of the tower's orientation, it works also as a giant sundial, which uses the Europa Square to indicate the hour.

See also
Torre de Collserola
List of tallest towers

External links 

 Montjuic Telecommunications Tower, Barcelona
 
 Montjuic Tower at Factoría Urbana: Photos and technical information about the tower

1992 establishments in Spain
1992 Summer Olympics
Buildings and structures in Barcelona
Communication towers in Spain
Inclined towers
Neo-futurism architecture
Santiago Calatrava structures
Sants-Montjuïc
Towers completed in 1992
Towers in Catalonia